Colorado Springs East Airport  is a private airport located  east of the central business district of the city of Colorado Springs, and  northwest of the central business district of the city of Ellicott in El Paso County, Colorado, United States.

Facilities and aircraft 
Colorado Springs East Airport covers a total area of 284 acres which contains three runways:
 Runway 17R/35L: , surface: asphalt
 Runway 17L/35R: , surface: gravel
 Runway 8/26: , surface: gravel/dirt

For the 12-month period ending December 31, 2008, the airport had 8,760 aircraft operations, an average of 24 per day: 80% general aviation local, 20% general aviation transient, and no military. There are 58 aircraft based at this airport: 54 single engine, one multi-engine, one helicopter, one glider, one ultra-light, and no military.

References

External links 
Colorado Springs East Airport at Colorado DOT website

Airports in Colorado
Transportation buildings and structures in El Paso County, Colorado